The House of Representatives of the National Assembly of the 7th convocation is the lower house of the National Assembly, the Parliament of the Republic of Belarus, whose members were elected on 17 November 2019.

Term of office:

 Start date — 17 November 2019.
 First plenary session — 6 December 2019.
 End date — no later than 5 November 2023.

The first meeting of the House of Representatives of the VII convocation, in accordance with the decisions of the Central Commission for Elections and Republican Referendums, was held on 6 December 2019. In accordance with the Regulations, the first meeting of the Chamber was opened and, before the election of the Chairman of the House of Representatives, was chaired by the Chairman of the CEC of the Republic of Belarus Lidia Yermoshina. By secret ballot with the use of ballots at the first meeting, the chairman of the House of Representatives was elected, who for the fourth time became Vladimir Andreichenko and the deputy chairman of the Chamber, who became Valery Mitskevich.

Election 
According to the Central Commission for Elections and Referendums, 5,319,568 voters took part in the voting, or 77.4% of the total number included in the voter lists, which is 2.7% more than in the 2016 elections. Elections were held in all districts, that is, all 110 deputies of the House of Representatives were elected.

According to the final results of the elections, 20 candidates from political parties (19.1%) were elected to the House of Representatives of the 7th convocation, of which 11 candidates from the Communist Party (10% of the total). Also, 44 women (40.0%), as well as 2 candidates under the age of 30 became deputies of the seventh convocation, in addition, 30 current deputies (27.3%) were re-elected.

Composition

Leadership 

 Chairman of the House of Representatives -Vladimir Andreichenko.
 Deputy Chairman of the House of Representatives - Valery Mitskevich.

Standing commissions 

 Standing Commission on Legislation - Chairwoman Svetlana Lyubetskaya
 Standing Commission on State Building, Local Self-Government and Regulations - Chairman Valentin Semenyako
 Standing Commission on National Security - Chairman Oleg Belokonev
 Standing Commission on Economic Policy - Chairman Leonid Brich
 Standing Committee on Budget and Finance - Chairwoman Lyudmila Nizhevich
 Standing Commission on Agrarian Policy - Chairman Nikolay Shevchuk
 Standing Commission on Ecology, Nature Management and the Chernobyl Disaster - Chairman Nikolai Vasilkov
 Standing Commission on Human Rights, Ethnic Relations and the Mass Media - Chairman Gennady Davydko;
 Standing Commission on Education, Culture and Science - Chairman Igor Marzalyuk
 Standing Commission on Labor and Social Affairs - Chairwoman Lyudmila Kananovich
 Standing Commission on Health, Physical Culture, Family and Youth Policy - Chairwoman Lyudmila Makarina-Kibak
 Standing Committee on Industry, Fuel and Energy Complex, Transport and Communications - Chairman Igor Omarovsky
 Standing Commission on Housing Policy and Construction - Chairman Viktor Nikolaykin
 Standing Committee on International Affairs - Chairman Andrey Savinykh.

Deputies 
Below is a list of the names of deputies who are elected to the House of Representatives of the National Assembly.

See also 

 7th Council of the Republic of Belarus

References 

Members of the House of Representatives of Belarus
House of Representatives of Belarus